Wipkingen is a quarter in the district 10 in Zürich.

It was formerly a municipality of its own, having been incorporated into Zürich in 1893.

The quarter has a population of 15,446 distributed on an area of 2.11 km².

Zentrum für Migrationskirchen (literally: Centre for migration churches) comprises eight Protestant churches from four continents, situated in the former church hall of the Evangelical Reformed Church of the Canton of Zürich in Zürich-Wipkingen, being a unique centre in Switzerland for the so-called migration churches.

Transportation 
Zurich Wipkingen railway station is a stop of Zürich S-Bahn line S24. The station is a 3-minute ride from Zürich Hauptbahnhof.

References 

District 10 of Zürich
Former municipalities of the canton of Zürich
Articles containing video clips